The women's 1500 metres at the 2022 World Athletics U20 Championships was held at the Estadio Olímpico Pascual Guerrero in Cali, Colombia from 1 to 4 August 2022.

Records
U20 standing records prior to the 2022 World Athletics U20 Championships were as follows:

Results

Round 1
The round 1 took place on 1 August, with the 41 athletes involved being splitted into 3 heats, 2 heats of 14 athletes and 1 of 13. The first 3 athletes in each heat ( Q ) and the next 3 fastest ( q ) qualified to the semi-final. The overall results were as follows:

Final
The final was started at 16:00 on 6 August. The results were as follows:

References

1500 metres
1500 metres at the World Athletics U20 Championships